HK Kryzhynka Kyiv was an ice hockey team in Kyiv, Ukraine. The team played in the Ukrainian Hockey League, the top level of Ukrainian ice hockey.

They were founded in 1991. Name changes
 from 1991 to 1999: Kryzhynka Kyiv
 from 1999 to 1999: Irbis Kyiv

Achievements
  1996–97 Ukrainian Hockey Championship

References

External links
Team profile on eurohockey.com

Ice hockey teams in Ukraine
Sport in Kyiv